Gregory Ruffin is an American football coach. Ruffin served as the head football coach at Shaw University in Raleigh, North Carolina (2002), Paine College in Augusta, Georgia (2014), and Texas College in Tyler, Texas (2016) and Edward Waters College in Jacksonville, Florida (2018–2021).

Ruffin was fired from his post at Edward Waters in February 2021 after a 53–0 loss to Jackson State. Joseph Carter was appointed interim head coach. Ruffin was hired by the Blytheville School District for the Head Football Coach position at Blytheville High School in June 2021. At the end of the 2021 season, Ruffin's record with the Blytheville Chickasaws was 2-8, 2-5 in conference. Ruffin resigned from the Blytheville School District on December 30, 2021. According to the Alabama State University's Twitter, Ruffin has accepted a position to coach the running backs for the ASU Hornets.

Head coaching record

Club

Varsity

References

External links
 Bethune Cookman profile

Year of birth missing (living people)
Living people
American football fullbacks
American football quarterbacks
Benedict Tigers football coaches
Edward Waters Tigers football coaches
Jackson State Tigers football coaches
Lane Dragons football players
Lincoln Blue Tigers football coaches
Ouachita Baptist Tigers football coaches
Paine Lions football coaches
Shaw Bears football coaches
Texas College Steers football coaches
Texas Southern Tigers football coaches
Tuskegee Golden Tigers football coaches
High school football coaches in Missouri
High school football coaches in Tennessee
Jackson State University alumni
African-American coaches of American football
African-American players of American football
20th-century African-American sportspeople
21st-century African-American sportspeople